Hugh Raymond Takahashi (born August 7, 1958) is a wrestler, judoka, coach, lecturer, and author who represented Canada in wrestling at the 1976 and 1984 Summer Olympic Games, the 1982 and 1983 Wrestling World Championships, the 1978 and 1982 Commonwealth Games, and the 1983 Pan-American Games. Takahashi won gold in the Flyweight division at the Commonwealth Games, and placed fourth at his second Olympic Games. He holds 16 Canadian national wrestling titles and was inducted into the Canadian Wrestling Hall of Fame in 1991. He is also ranked san-dan (third-degree black belt) in the Japanese martial art Judo, the son of noted Canadian judoka Masao Takahashi and June Takahashi, and the brother of fellow Olympian Phil Takahashi and Olympic coach Tina Takahashi.

Takahashi is currently a Lecturer in Kinesiology and the head coach of the men's and women's wrestling teams at the University of Western Ontario. In 2005 he co-authored a book titled Mastering Judo with his parents and three siblings, and is credited with researching and writing the first draft of the book.

Publications

See also
Wrestling in Canada
Judo in Canada
List of Canadian judoka

References

External links

Video
Interview with Takahashi, Part2 (Public History Canada on YouTube)
1983 Canadian Wrestling Championships Television Special featuring Takahashi, Part 2 (49 North Wrestling on YouTube)

1958 births
Living people
Canadian male judoka
Olympic wrestlers of Canada
Wrestlers at the 1976 Summer Olympics
Wrestlers at the 1984 Summer Olympics
Canadian male sport wrestlers
Wrestlers at the 1978 Commonwealth Games
Wrestlers at the 1982 Commonwealth Games
Commonwealth Games gold medallists for Canada
Commonwealth Games silver medallists for Canada
Pan American Games gold medalists for Canada
Sportspeople from Toronto
Western Mustangs players
Academic staff of the University of Western Ontario
Canadian sportspeople of Japanese descent
Commonwealth Games medallists in wrestling
Pan American Games medalists in wrestling
Wrestlers at the 1983 Pan American Games
Medalists at the 1983 Pan American Games
Medallists at the 1978 Commonwealth Games
Medallists at the 1982 Commonwealth Games